This is a list of estimated global populations of Carnivora species. This list is not comprehensive, as not all carnivorans have had their numbers quantified.

See also
 
Lists of organisms by population
Lists of mammals by population

References

Mammals
carnivorans
Carnivorans